Timbellus lightbourni is a species of sea snail, a marine gastropod mollusk in the family Muricidae, the murex snails or rock snails.

Description
The size of an adult shell varies between 25mm and 39mm.

Distribution
This species is distributed in the Atlantic Ocean along the Bermudas.

References

Further reading
 Merle D., Garrigues B. & Pointier J.-P. (2011) Fossil and Recent Muricidae of the world. Part Muricinae. Hackenheim: Conchbooks. 648 pp. page(s): 133

Muricidae
Gastropods described in 1979